IJCU Dragons Utrecht is a professional ice hockey team in Utrecht, Netherlands. The team played under the name "Hoek Dragons Utrecht" in the Dutch Eredivisie, the top professional hockey division in the Netherlands in 2008-2009. In 2013, it ceased operations. However, the team was reborn in 2019, when they entered the Dutch "Eerste Divisie" (First Division) for the first time in 6 years, finishing with 8 wins, 10 losses, and 2 overtime losses. Home games are played at De Vechtsebanen.

History

Utrecht has had an ice hockey club for many years, including teams named "Dragons". For 2008-2009, the team created a professional squad to compete in the Eredivisie, finishing with a record of 2 wins and 22 losses. They played in the Eerste divisie, the top amateur league in the Netherlands until January 2013, when a loss of players required them to forfeit the remainder of the season. 

In March of 2019, rumours of a return were spoken of on social media. They held tryouts shortly thereafter to determine their selection for the following season. the team was reborn in 2019, when they entered the Dutch "Eerste Divisie" (First Division) for the first time in 6 years, finishing with 8 wins, 10 losses, and 2 overtime losses. After qualifying for the playoffs, Utrecht lost in the opening round to Yeti's Breda in two straight games. Long time player Ivo Beulen led the team in scoring for the season. 

After playing only one game to start the 2020/2021, the First Division season was paused and later cancelled due to the ongoing Coronavirus pandemic. The team announced it would continue the following season, which is planned to start in September of 2021.

Season results

Note: GP = Games played, W = Wins, OTW = Overtime Wins, OTL = Overtime Losses, L = Losses, GF = Goals for, GA = Goals against, Pts = Points

Squad 2019/2020

Goalies

75 Elaine Wilkes

60 Danny Gelder

1  Shane Sturkenboom

Defence

4  Geno Zwiers

5  Nigel Zwiers

6  Boris Sevo

7  Timo Verheul

8  Stein Martens

11 Vince Van de Kraak "C"

27 Kale Jewell

28 Jordie Wareham

29 Jerry Kinneging "A"

89 Bart Engel

Forwards

2  Tim Schaasberg
  
9  Justus Bos

10 Teun Landzaat

12 Indy Bontan

19 Nicky Collard

47 Kolton Dunwoody

66 Pieter Kronenburg

81 Mike Collard

94 Dylan Collard "A"

97 Andrew Trapman

Staff

Stefan Collard, coach

Dave Wilkes, trainer

Maik Janssen, teammanager

Dennis Lodewijk, equipment

Arnout Meinema, equipment

Championships

None.

External links
 Utrecht Dragons official website (Dutch)
 Netherlands Ice Hockey Union (Dutch)

Ice hockey teams in the Netherlands
Ice hockey clubs established in 2008
2008 establishments in the Netherlands